Milton Frank Trost (March 4, 1913 – April 2, 1986) was a player in the National Football League. He played his first five seasons with the Chicago Bears before playing in his final season with the Philadelphia Eagles.

References

Players of American football from Detroit
Chicago Bears players
Philadelphia Eagles players
Marquette Golden Avalanche football players
1913 births
1986 deaths